Acad. Prof. Dr. Honoris Causa Ion Irimescu (27 February 1903 – 29 October 2005) was one of Romania's greatest sculptors and sketchers as well as a member of the Romanian Academy. In 2001 he was awarded the Prize of Excellence for Romanian Culture. He is often referred to as the "patriarch of Romanian art and sculpture".

Biography 
The Romanian artist was the son of Petre Irimescu and Maria Cazaban; he had two brothers: Alexandru and Verona. After the graduation of Primary School No. 1 Fălticeni in 1915, he followed the secondary course at "Nicu Gane" College from the same city (1915-1924), where he took part in the theatre, creating the decorations. Between 1924 and 1928, he was a student at Bucharest National University of Arts, where his instructors included Dimitrie Paciurea and Oscar Han. While a student, he painted the "Saints Archangels Michael and Gabriel" Church from Oprişeni, Fălticeni. In 1928, after the graduation of Bucharest National University of Arts, he was named Arts teacher at "Ştefan cel Mare" Normal School, Fălticeni. In 1933 he married Eugenia Augustina Melidon, a teacher. He became an Arts teacher at the Paşcani Secondary School (1933). In 1936, he was named Arts teacher at the C.F.R. "Aurel Vlaicu" College, Bucharest until 1939, when he became Arts and Calligraphy teacher at "Radu Greceanu" Boys College from Slatina.

Works, exhibitions, collections, museums 
In 1928, at the graduation of the academy, he made his debut at the Bucharest Painting and Sculpture Exhibition, where he displayed his work "Eden". In 1929, he participated at the Official Salon of Painting and Sculpture, where he exhibited his works "Nud de fată", and at the French Artists' Salon. In 1930, he went to Paris after receiving a scholarship  from the Fontaney-Aux-Roses Romanian School and he enrolled in Académie de la Grande Chaumière, where he worked under the guidance of the teacher Joseph Bernard, being especially influenced by the sculptures of Antoine Bourdelle. In 1932, he received an Honorary Mention of the French Artists' Society for the work "Autoportret", exhibited at the Spring Salon in Paris. At the Autumn Salon in Paris from the same year he participated with the work "Portret de fată". Irimescu returned to Romania in 1933, and thenceforth he participated in numerous organised exhibitions inside and outside the country. In 1940, he was named as teacher at Belle Arte Academy, Iaşi, later (1950) at Cluj-Napoca, and from 1966 he was a sculpture teacher at "Nicolae Grigorescu" Plastic Arts Institute, Bucharest.

In 1942, he participated at Moldavian Official Salon, Iaşi, where he was awarded with the Culture and Arts Ministry prize. In the same year, 1942, he took part in the Romanian Arts Exhibition, part of the biennial events taking place in Venice, with the work "Cap în stil florentin".

In 1956, he participated in the Venice biennial events, where he exhibited in the Romanian Pavilion 15 works and, in 1961, he exhibited at the Contemporary Sculpture Exhibition, organised next to Rodin Museum, Paris. He also exhibited his works at Bern, Helsinki, Budapest, Dresden, Moscow, Warsaw, Prague, Paris, Stockholm, London, Rome, Berlin, Bonn, Istanbul, Ankara, Tel Aviv, Damascus, Cairo, Alexandria.

In 1975, he donated an impressive number of sculptures and drawings to the Fălticeni Museum, with which it created the "Ion Irimescu" Collection. He was named as the president Romanian Plastic Artists' Union in 1978, where he activated until 1989.

On 27 February 2003, the Romanian Academy celebrated him on the occasion of his 100th birthday.

At the end of his life he retreated to Fălticeni, where he took care of the museum that contained half of his works. Ion Irimescu donated his works (approximately 300 sculptures and 1000 drawings) and, as a result, it was created the biggest permanent collection of an author from Romania. One of his works, the statue of Dimitrie Cantemir, was at Ambrosiana Library, Milan, between the statues of Dante and Shakespeare.

Ion Irimescu said that, during one meeting with Nicolae Ceauşescu, he expressed his intention to sculpt a life-size bronze statue of Mihail Sadoveanu, but he did't have enough material to finish his work. To his astonishment, Ceauşescu sent him as a gift the statue of Stalin. Under these circumstances, the statue of Stalin shaped by Dumitru Demu was transformed in the statue of Mihail Sadoveanu, designed carefully by Ion Irimescu.

On 28 October 2005, Ion Irimescu died and was buried in Oprişeni Cemetery.

Footnotes

External links
Personal site

1903 births
2005 deaths
Alumni of the Académie de la Grande Chaumière
Honorary members of the Romanian Academy
Men centenarians
People from Fălticeni
Romanian people of French descent
Romanian centenarians
Romanian engravers
20th-century Romanian sculptors
20th-century engravers